Sun in the House of the Scorpion is the second album by Ukrainian black metal band Blood of Kingu. It was released under Candlelight Records on May 24, 2010. The album marks the beginning of the use of death growls, which does not exist in the previous album.
The cover painting is an untitled work from 1977 by Zdzislaw Beksinski.

Track listing

References

2010 albums
Blood of Kingu albums